Winnsboro High School is a public high school located in the city of Winnsboro, Texas, United States and classified as a 3A school by the University Interscholastic League (UIL). It is a part of the Winnsboro Independent School District located in northeastern Wood County. In 2015, the school was rated "Met Standard" by the Texas Education Agency.

Athletics
The Winnsboro Red Raiders compete in these sports - 

Baseball
Basketball
Cross Country
Football
Golf
Powerlifting
Softball
Tennis
Track and Field

State Titles
Girls Basketball - 
1999(3A), 2000(3A), 2001(3A)

State Finalists
Girls Basketball - 
1991(3A), 1992(3A), 1998(3A), 2004(3A), 2007(2A), 2022(3A)
Boys Track
2013(2A)

References

External links
Winnsboro ISD

Schools in Wood County, Texas
Public high schools in Texas